Aldo Cevenini (8 November 1889 – 26 October 1973) was an Italian professional football player and coach who played as a forward.

Club career
Cevenini began his career with Libertas Milano, and later played for Milan, where he also later served as the team's captain, as well as cross-city rivals Inter, and Novese. He won the Italian championship in the 1919–20 and 1921–22 season, with Inter and Novese respectively.

International career
Cevenini made his debut for the Italy national football team in the team's first ever game on 15 May 1910 against France.

Personal life
Aldo's younger brothers Mario Cevenini, Luigi Cevenini, Cesare Cevenini and Carlo Cevenini all played football professionally. To distinguish them, Aldo was known as Cevenini I, Mario as Cevenini II, Luigi as Cevenini III, Cesare as Cevenini IV and Carlo as Cevenini V.

Honours

Player
Inter
Serie A: 1919–20

Novese
Serie A: 1921–22

References

External links
 Career summary by playerhistory.com
 

1889 births
1973 deaths
Italian footballers
Italy international footballers
A.C. Milan players
Inter Milan players
Italian football managers
Atalanta B.C. managers
Association football forwards
U.S.D. Novese players